David Gordon (born 1967) is an American novelist.

Biography
Gordon initially worked as a writer and editor for adult magazines Hustler, Chic and Barely Legal in the 1990s before moving on to write novels.

His debut novel, The Serialist, won the 2011 First Novelist Award and was a finalist for the Mystery Writers of America's 2011 Edgar Award for Best First Novel. "Second-Rate Novelist" became a major hit, winning three literary contests and being turned into a full-length motion film by Toei, directed by Izaki Nobuaki and starring Kamikawa Takaya.

Works

 The Serialist (2010)
 Mystery Girl (2013)
 White Tiger on Snow Mountain: Stories (2014)
 The Bouncer (2018)
 The Hard Stuff (2019)
 Against the Law (2021)
 The Wild Life (2022)

Articles

References

External links

 David Gordon, official blog
 David Gordon, publisher's author page

21st-century American novelists
American male novelists
Living people
1967 births
Writers from New York City
21st-century American male writers
Columbia University alumni
Novelists from New York (state)